Egged Ta'avura is an Israeli bus company. It is a subsidiary of the Egged Bus Cooperative and Ta'avura Holdings, and was founded by a merger of two smaller Egged subsidiaries, following privatization and public transportation reform in Israel in the 2000s. Its chairman is Gideon Mizrahi, and the CEO is the retired Israel Police Major General Mickey Levi.

In March 2007, five Egged Ta'avura drivers were killed in a traffic accident in the Ginaton Junction (Highways 40 and 443). A monument was erected for them on the grounds of the Ashkelon Central Bus Station.

Fleet and operations
Egged Ta'avura operates routes in the areas of Ma'ale Adumim, and the West Bank. The company was also slated to operate routes in Beitar Illit, but failed talks with the Illit bus company resulted Illit taking over the transportation in the Israeli settlement and city. It has a fleet of about 650 buses, of which about 220 are used for public transport. Originally, its fleet was entirely rented from Egged on a one-year contract, until it was able to buy new European buses. The rented fleet was mostly transferred to Egged's service in Jerusalem. On February 12, 2016, All routes in northern Negev were transferred to Dan BaDarom. The intracity service in Ashkelon has transferred to Dan BaDarom in May 2016. On May 31, 2016, All bus routes that Egged Ta'avura operated in El'ad were transferred in May 2016 to Kavim that won the Ono El'ad tender nine months earlier. In July 2016, The intracity bus routes in Ashkelon were transferred to Dan BaDarom.

The bus routes operated by Egged Ta'avura are:
 Intracity service in Netanya
 Routes 100, 101, 102 and 112 from Shafirim to Jerusalem.
 All intracity service in Mevaseret Zion and Ma'ale Adumim.
 Intercity service in the west bank.

Buses and equipment
In May 2008, Egged Ta'avura signed a NIS 5 million deal with the Ra'anana-based transSpot company to supply its buses with screens that will allow travellers to receive real-time information on stations and their ETAs.

References

External links
 

Bus companies of Israel